Fabian Fallert (born 12 May 1997) is a German professional tennis player who specializes in doubles.

Fallert has a career high ATP doubles ranking of world No. 101, achieved on 6 February 2023. He has won three ATP Challenger doubles titles.

Career
In his ATP Tour debut, he reached the doubles final of the 2022 Sofia Open with partner Oscar Otte.

Doubles performance timeline

ATP career finals

Doubles: 1 (1 runner-up)

ATP Challenger and ITF Futures/World Tennis Tour finals

Doubles: 20 (12–8)

References

External links
 
 
 
 

1997 births
Living people
German male tennis players
People from Bad Urach
Sportspeople from Tübingen (region)
Tennis people from Baden-Württemberg
Ole Miss Rebels men's tennis players